In Mandaeism, laufa or laupa is the concept of a spiritual connection forged between Tibil (Earth) and the World of Light. It has been variously translated as "communion," "spiritual union," "spiritual connection," or "vital connection."

In rituals
Laufa between the World of Light and Tibil can be established through rituals mediated by Mandaean priests, who serve as "uthras (i.e., beings from the World of Light) on earth" during these rituals. These rituals include masbuta (baptism) and masiqta rituals. Mandaeans believe that laufa was initially established when the material world was first created. Mandaeans regularly re-establish and reconfirm this connection by regularly performing rituals with priestly assistance. Laufa can also be reconstituted through written records of unbroken ancestral lineages, such as the Ṭabahatan ("Our Ancestors") commemoration prayer in the Qolasta with its long list of ancestors' names.

According to Mandaean priest Brikha Nasoraia (2021):

See also
Theosis (Eastern Christian theology)
Lofani

References

Mandaean philosophical concepts
Spirituality
Mandaic words and phrases